Barbara Rütting (21 November 1927 – 28 March 2020), also known as Barbara Ruetting was a German film actress, politician, author and vegetarianism activist. She appeared in 50 films between 1952 and 1979.

Biography

Rütting won the German Film Award as Best New Actress of the Year in 1953. She was a star of German cinema in the 1950s and 1960s, appearing in Canaris with O. E. Hasse and in The Last Bridge with Maria Schell. In 1961, she played the female lead as a journalist in the American-German film Town Without Pity, co-starring Kirk Douglas and Christine Kaufmann.

After the 1970s, Rütting's film and television appearances were sporadic. She instead focused on her career as a writer of children's and lifestyle books. She was a vegetarian and became a vocal supporter of animal rights and environmental protection. She joined the Alliance 90/The Greens in the 1980s, and was elected twice, in 2002 and 2008, into the Landtag of Bavaria (Bavarian parliament). She left the Greens in 2009, and became a member of V-Partei3 in 2016.

Rütting authored natural food cookbooks including a vegan cookbook in 2013.

Partial filmography

 Turtledove General Delivery (1952) – Ilse Krüger
 All Clues Lead to Berlin (1952) – Tamara, Dolmetscherin
 Christina (1953) – Christina Neuhaus
 The Country Schoolmaster (1954) – Ursula Diewen
 The Last Bridge (1954) – Militza
 A Double Life (1954) – Sybil
 Canaris (1954) – Irene von Harbeck
 Espionage (1955) – Nadeschda
 A Girl Without Boundaries (1955) – Maria Johnson
 In Hamburg When the Nights Are Long (1956) – Karin Thorwaldt
 The Vulture Wally (1956) – Geierwally
 Rot ist die Liebe (1957) – Lisa
 Glücksritter (1957) – Alice Dreher
 Liebe, wie die Frau sie wünscht (1957) – Renate
  (1957) – Charlotte Bernhardt
 All the Sins of the Earth (1958) – Dr. Regine Lenz
 I Was All His (1958) – Anette Klinger
 Heart Without Mercy (1958) – Anja Wegener
 Un homme se penche sur son passé (1958) – Hannah Malloy
 A Time to Love and a Time to Die (1958) – Woman Guerrilla
  (1958) – Marianne Ospel
 Frauensee (1958) – Martina Nissen
  (1959) – Monika
 Arzt ohne Gewissen (1959) – Dr. Marianne Cordt
  (1961) – Lysistrata
 Town Without Pity (1961) – Inge Koerner
 The Shadows Grow Longer (1961) – Christa Andres
 Doctor Sibelius (1962) – Sabine Hellmann
 Love Has to Be Learned (1963) – Hermine
 The Squeaker (1963) – Beryl Stedman
  (1963) – Susanne
 The Phantom of Soho (1964) – Clarinda Smith
 Operation Crossbow (1965) – Hanna Reitsch
 Neues vom Hexer (1965) – Margie Fielding
 Four Queens for an Ace (1966) – Miss Parker (uncredited)
 Tamara (1968) – Mutter Bricks
 Eine Frau sucht Liebe (1969) – Helen
  (1969, TV series) – Dr. Kramer
  (1972) – Celia
 Der Kommissar: Ein Playboy segnet das Zeitliche (1975, TV series episode) – Frau Eber
 The Old Fox: Der Neue (1980, TV series episode) – Beate Wallner
 The Old Fox: Das letzte Wort hat die Tote (1980, TV series episode) – Brigitte Moland
 Derrick: Prozente (1981, TV series episode) – Frau Mertens
 Ein Fall für zwei: Das Haus in Frankreich (1981, TV series episode) – Birgit Weißenborn
 Schwarz Rot Gold: Um Knopf und Kragen (1984, TV series episode) – Frau Lövenich
 Rosamunde Pilcher: Im Licht des Feuers (2000, TV series episode) – Catherine

Selected publications

 1976 Mein Kochbuch – naturgesunde Köstlichkeiten aus aller Welt
 1979 Ach du grüner Kater (for children)
 1979 Koch- und Spielbuch für Kinder
 1985 Mein neues Kochbuch
 1988 Mein Gesundheitsbuch
 1991 Lieblingsmenüs aus meiner Vollwertküche
 1993 Träumen allein genügt nicht
 1997 Grüne Rezepte für den blauen Planeten
 Essen wir uns gesund. 30 Jahre unterwegs in Sachen Vollwerternährung, 
 Lachen wir uns gesund. Anleitungen zum Glücklichsein. 3-7766-2236-9
 Bleiben wir schön gesund, 
 Koch- und Spielbuch für Kinder vorgestellt von dem Kater Fettucini, 
 Ach du grüner Kater (Hörbuch) 
 Mein neues Kochbuch. Schlemmereien aus der Vollwertküche, 
 … und dennoch. Erfahrungen eines Lebens. Herbig Verlag, München, 2004
 2007 Ich bin alt und das ist gut so. Meine Muntermacher aus acht gelebten Jahrzehnten. Nymphenburger Verlag, 
 2013 Vegan und vollwertig: Meine Lieblingsmenus für Frühling, Sommer, Herbst und Winter Nymphenburger Verlag.

References

External links
 

1927 births
2020 deaths
20th-century German actresses
20th-century German women writers
20th-century German writers
21st-century German women writers
21st-century German writers
German film actresses
German television actresses
German vegetarianism activists
People from Ludwigsfelde
People from the Province of Brandenburg
Rajneesh movement
Vegan cookbook writers
Women cookbook writers